Mesoplia is a genus of bees in the family Apidae. There are 17 described species in Mesoplia.

Species

References

Further reading

 

Apinae